Avery Council Upchurch (December 22, 1928 – June 30, 1994) was Mayor of Raleigh, North Carolina from 1983 to 1993. His term in office was the longest of any mayor of Raleigh in the 20th century and corresponded to a period of rapid growth of the city.

Upchurch was born in Wake County, North Carolina and moved to Raleigh as a teenager. He operated two filling stations in the city before entering politics. Having served on the Planning Commission and on Raleigh City Council prior to election as Mayor, his administration focused on expansion of infrastructure such as:
 streets, 
 water supply and sewage treatment, 
 curbside recycling, 
 downtown parking, 
 the Alltel Pavilion at Walnut Creek, 
 renovation of Raleigh Memorial Auditorium (now incorporated in the Progress Energy Center for the Performing Arts), 
 planning for the expansion of the Raleigh Convention Center, and 
 initial study of a new sports arena later built as the RBC Center. 

He was noted for his unpretentious style and his consensus approach to problem solving.

Upchurch elected not to run for a sixth term. Within months of retiring from office, he contracted cancer and died. The headquarters of Raleigh city government was subsequently renamed the Avery C. Upchurch Government Complex in his honor.

Mayors of Raleigh, North Carolina
Raleigh City Council members
1928 births
1994 deaths
20th-century American politicians
Deaths from cancer in North Carolina